The Shanghai Commercial and Savings Bank is a bank of the Republic of China, currently based in Taipei, Taiwan.

In 1915, it was founded by Chen Guangfu (K. P. Chen) in Shanghai, mainland China. Chen became the first president, and The-Chin Chuang was elected first chairman.

Early years
The bank was established in Shanghai in 1915 by Chen Guangfu, a graduate of the Wharton School of Finance and one of the most successful Chinese bankers of the 20th century.

In 1931, the Bank completed the construction of its head office building in Shanghai, which was the most modern banking edifice in China at that time. The bank started its business with a capital of less than 100,000 silver dollars and with a workforce of four. In 1934, the bank had become the nation’s top private bank, with over 2,700 employees and over 110 branches.

World War 2 
During World War II, the bank, with a new board of directors and supervisors, moved its head office to Chongqing, the wartime capital of Chinese resistance. The head office remained in Chongqing until the end of the war. In addition, the bank extended its banking network from the southeastern, middle, and northern parts of the country, to the southwestern and northwestern parts. Due to political reasons, the bank was forced to shut down in 1950.

Post-war 

In 1954, the bank accompanied the government to Taiwan and was allowed to establish its head office in Taipei to prepare for the resumption of business.

It was not until June 1965 that the bank was approved to restart its operation in Taipei with a capital of NT$15 million. Chen was the chairman, and the bank was the only private mainland bank to relocate to Taiwan. During the resumption, the bank acted conservatively.

The Savings Department and Kaohsiung Branch were set up in 1966 and 1971, respectively.

See also

 Chen Guangfu, founder
 Shanghai Commercial Bank (Hong Kong)
 Bank of Shanghai (Mainland China)
 List of companies of Taiwan
 List of banks in Taiwan

References

Reading 
 The Making of Modern Chinese Financial Entrepreneurship: The Case of Chen Guangfu by Pui-tak Lee, University of Hong Kong
 Personal papers of K. P. Chen deposited in the Rare Book and Manuscript Library, Columbia University,
 Recently published materials about K. P. Chen from mainland China's archives
 The Shanghai Commercial & Savings Bank, Ltd

External links

 The Shanghai Commercial & Savings Bank Official site

Defunct banks of China
Banks of Taiwan
Banks established in 1915
Chinese companies established in 1915